Engyum fasciatum is a species of beetle in the family Cerambycidae. It was described by Martins in 2009.

References 

Neoibidionini
Beetles described in 2009